Romer Shoal Light is a sparkplug lighthouse in Lower New York Bay, on the north edge of the Swash Channel, about  south of Ambrose Channel and  north of Sandy Hook, New Jersey, in the entrance to New York Harbor.  It is in New Jersey, very close to the border with New York. Named as Romer Shoal Light Station, it was added to the National Register of Historic Places on January 24, 2007, for its significance in architecture, engineering, transportation, and maritime history.

History and description
An 1870 edition of The Historical Magazine records that the shoal was named after Colonel Wolfgang William Romer, who sounded the waters of New York Bay in 1700 on order of the governor of New York. https://www.lighthousefriends.com/light.asp?ID=655

The Light was heavily damaged during Hurricane Sandy. The non-profit that has taken over stewardship of the Light is working with FEMA and private donors to preserve this national landmark.

See also
 National Register of Historic Places listings in Monmouth County, New Jersey

References

Lighthouses completed in 1898
Transportation buildings and structures in Monmouth County, New Jersey
Lighthouses on the National Register of Historic Places in New Jersey
National Register of Historic Places in Monmouth County, New Jersey
New Jersey Register of Historic Places
1898 establishments in New Jersey

External links